

Membership

Regular season champions

Men's basketball
1934 
1935 DNP
1936 
1937     
1938     
1939 Long Island    
1940 DNP
1941 DNP
1942 DNP
1943 St. John's    
1944 DNP
1945 DNP
1946 /
1947     
1948     
1949 /    
1950 CCNY
1951     
1952 St. John’s (N.Y.)
1953 
1954 St. Francis (N.Y.)
1955    
1956 St. Francis (N.Y.)   
1957      
1958     
1959    
1960 NYU     
1961    
1962     
1963

External links
MNYC school membership timeline
MNYC men's basketball champions